Selwyn St. Bernard (born 30 July 1977) is a Trinidad and Tobago rugby union and rugby league footballer. As a rugby union player, his position is as a flanker.

He first played at Caribs, in Trinidad, moving then to England, where he represented Gateshead Thunder, in rugby league, and Basingstoke R.F.C., in rugby union, from 1999/00 to 2004/05. He then moved to Blaydon RFC, where he still plays.

St. Bernard is an international player for Trinidad and Tobago in rugby union, having played in the Rugby World Cup qualifiers, more recently in 2008, for the 2011 Rugby World Cup finals. He also played for his country at IRB Sevens. He's currently one of the three semi-professional players for the "Calypso Warriors", all of them playing in England.

References

1977 births
Living people
Blaydon RFC players
Expatriate rugby union players in England
Newcastle Thunder players
Rugby league props
Rugby union flankers
Trinidad and Tobago expatriate rugby union players
Trinidad and Tobago expatriates in the United Kingdom
Trinidad and Tobago rugby union players
West Indies national rugby league team players